Clavus protentus is a species of sea snail, a marine gastropod mollusk in the family Drilliidae.

Description
The length of the shell attains 13.5 mm, its diameter 4.5 mm.

The elongate turriform shell is white in the subsutural and peripheral region, with the remainder reddish brown. The basal part of the body whorl shows rows of white dots. The shell contains 6-7 whorls, which are concave on top and convex below. The axial ribs are initially arcuate and in later whorls opisthocline, numbering  12 on the penultimate whorl. The dense, spiral threads are very small. The aperture is oblong-ovate. The wide anal sinus has an U-shaped form. The columella is almost straight. The sharp outer lip is thickened towards the suture.

Distribution
This marine species is endemic to endemic to Lifou, Loyalty Islands.

References

 Hervier, J. (1896b) Descriptions d'espèces nouvelles de l'Archipel de la Nouvelle-Calédonie. Journal de Conchyliologie, 44, 51–95
  Kilburn R.N., Fedosov A. & Kantor Yu.I. (2014) The shallow-water New Caledonia Drilliidae of genus Clavus Montfort, 1810 (Mollusca: Gastropoda: Conoidea). Zootaxa 3818(1): 1-69

External links

protentus
Gastropods described in 1991